The broomtail wrasse (Cheilinus lunulatus) is a species of wrasse native to the Red Sea and Indian Ocean.

Description
In adults, the head is large and bright green, with small spots. The lips are large and blue. The pectoral fins are yellow, while the abdominal, the anal, and caudal fins are dark blue. The body is yellow-green in the middle and dark purple in the other part. Close to the operculum is a characteristic bright-yellow marking on a black background. It has a long fringed caudal fin, resembling an old broom (hence the common name). Females and juveniles show large, dark stripes on their flanks. This wrasse feeds mainly on molluscs and hard-shelled invertebrates. It is oviparous.

Distribution
This species occurs in the Red Sea to the Gulf of Oman (mainly near Djibouti, Eritrea, the Seychelles, and Somalia). In the Indo-Pacific, it is replaced by the closely related Cheilinus trilobatus.

Habitat

References 

 FishBase
 
 Biolib
 Pictures of C. lunulatus
 Fran.cornu.free
 Lieske E.,  1998 - Peces de arrecifes coralinos del Indo-Pacífico y Caribe – Omega, Barcelona
 Randall J.E. - Red Sea reef fishes - Immel Publishing, London 1986

External links
 

Broomtail wrasse
Fish described in 1775